Downton Abbey: A New Era is a 2022 historical drama film and the sequel to the 2019 film Downton Abbey. The film was written by Julian Fellowes, the creator and writer of the television series of the same name and was directed by Simon Curtis.
Downton Abbey: A New Era was released in the United Kingdom on 29 April 2022 by Universal Pictures and was released in the United States on 20 May by Focus Features. Like the first film, it received generally positive reviews from critics.

Plot
In 1928, Tom Branson, the Earl of Grantham's widowed son-in-law, marries Lucy Smith, the illegitimate daughter of and sole heir to Lady Maud Bagshaw, Queen Mary's lady-in-waiting. Violet Crawley, the Dowager Countess of Grantham, astonishes the family by revealing that long ago she was gifted a villa in the South of France by the Marquis de Montmirail, who has recently passed away. She is leaving it to her great-granddaughter, Sybbie, Tom's daughter with the late Lady Sybil Crawley, to ensure that she has a more equal social and financial standing to her cousins.

A film production company wants to use Downton to shoot a silent film called The Gambler. Robert declines, until his eldest daughter and estate manager, Lady Mary Talbot, convinces him that the fee would be enough to replace Downton's leaking roof. The household staff are eager to see the film stars, but lead actress Myrna Dalgliesh's haughtiness offends several of them.

The new marquis invites the family to visit the villa. The ailing Violet is unable to travel, but Tom and Lucy, Lady Bagshaw, Robert Crawley and his wife Cora, and their daughter Edith (the Marchioness of Hexham) and her husband, Bertie Pelham (the Marquess of Hexham), accept. Lady Edith, once again writing for the magazine she owns, uses this as a working assignment as well. Lady Mary remains at Downton to oversee the filming.

Montmirail welcomes the family to the villa. His mother wants to contest Violet Crawley's ownership. However, the family lawyer states that there is no basis for a claim and so the villa is legally Violet's. The marquis speaks privately with Robert and stuns him by implying that Robert's birth date, nine months after the Dowager Countess visited in 1864, could mean they are half-brothers. That night, Cora reveals to Robert she may be fatally ill. Robert breaks down at the prospect of losing his mother, the Crawley name, and his wife in short succession.

At Downton, the studio cancels The Gambler because silent films are no longer profitable in the wake of "talkie" films. Lady Mary suggests salvaging the project by dubbing in the dialogue for the completed scenes. Lead actor Guy Dexter's voice is suitable, but Myrna Dalgleish's cockney accent is inappropriate for her upper-class character. Mrs Hughes suggests that Lady Mary could dub Dalgleish's voice. Fearing her career is ruined, Dalgleish quits, but Downton servants Anna and Daisy persuade her to complete the film. Former Downton footman Mr Molesley, who can lip-read, reconstructs the dialogue for dubbing, and creates a dialogued script for the remaining story.

The family returns to Downton while filming continues. Lady Mary rebuffs director Jack Barber's flirtations, although her husband Henry's prolonged absence for a car rally has strained their marriage. Downton's closeted butler, Thomas Barrow, accepts Dexter's offer to manage his house in Los Angeles and be a travelling companion. Dr Clarkson diagnoses Cora with pernicious anaemia, a treatable condition. Cora helps Dalgleish develop an American accent, potentially saving her career. Edith, unfulfilled and constrained as a marchioness, intends to resume working at her London-based magazine which she does a few times a week. Newlywed servants Daisy and Andy scheme to match up Daisy's former father-in-law, Mr Mason, and Downton cook Mrs Patmore. When the film's unpaid extras walk out, the Downton staff replace them, ensuring its completion. Barber offers Molesley a lucrative deal as a screenwriter. Molesley then proposes to Miss Baxter, unaware that he is being overheard on an open microphone.

Violet assures Robert that the late Lord Grantham was his father and that nothing happened between her and Montmirail. Violet's health deteriorates further and she dies surrounded by her loved ones. Mary asks Mr Carson to train footman Andy as the new butler. Months later, Tom and Lucy return to Downton with their infant. A new portrait hangs in the main hall, that of the late Dowager Countess.

Cast

Production
After the release of the first film in 2019, creator Julian Fellowes and the cast stated that they already had ideas about doing a sequel. In January 2020, it was reported that Fellowes would begin working on it after he finished scripting drama series The Gilded Age. In September 2020, Jim Carter, who plays Carson, said that the script for the sequel had been written, and in February 2021, Hugh Bonneville, who plays Robert, stated in an interview with BBC Radio 2 that once the cast and crew had been vaccinated for COVID-19, the film would be made.

Principal photography was originally scheduled to take place from 12 June to 12 August 2021, in Hampshire, England, but Deadline Hollywood confirmed that production had started in mid-April 2021.
On 16 July 2021, Elizabeth McGovern announced on Instagram that she had completed filming. On 25 August 2021, the film's title Downton Abbey: A New Era was announced.

The principal cast of the first film returned. Joining the cast are Hugh Dancy, Laura Haddock, Nathalie Baye, Dominic West and Jonathan Zaccaï.

Soundtrack

Downton Abbey: A New Era (Original Motion Picture Soundtrack) is the film's soundtrack album and musical score album of the same name, composed by John Lunn and performed by The Chamber Orchestra of London with the voice of Cherise Roberts featured on two tracks. It was released on 29 April 2022 on CD, digital download and vinyl by Decca Gold, Decca Records and Universal Music.

Release
Downton Abbey: A New Era was scheduled originally to be released in cinemas on 22 December 2021, before having its release date moved to 18 March 2022, and subsequently to 29 April in the UK, and 20 May in North America. The film premiered at Leicester Square in London on 25 April 2022.

The film was originally set to stream in the United States on Peacock on 4 July, 45 days after its American theatrical release, but it was released to the streaming service on 24 June 2022, earlier than planned.

It was released on Blu-ray 4K, Blu-ray and DVD and digital download on 5 July 2022 by Universal Pictures Home Entertainment (through Studio Distribution Services LLC) in the United States, and was released on Blu-ray and DVD on 15 August 2022 by Universal through Warner Bros. Home Entertainment in the United Kingdom.

Reception

Box office
Downton Abbey: A New Era grossed $44.2million in the United States and Canada and $48.5million in other countries, for a worldwide total of $92.7million.

In the United States and Canada, the film was released alongside Men, and was projected to gross $16–21 million from 3,820 cinemas over its opening weekend. It made $7.4 million on its first day, including $1 million from Thursday night previews. The film went on to debut at $16 million and finished second at the box office, thus opening at the lower end of projections. 48% of the opening weekend audience was over the age of 55 and Deadline Hollywood said it "repped the first time [exhibitors] saw older patrons since pre-pandemic". In its second weekend the film fell 64% to $5.8 million (and a total of $7.4 million over the four-day Memorial Day frame), finishing fourth. The large drop was attributed in-part to newcomer Top Gun: Maverick, whose audience was 55% over the age of 35, sharing much of the same demographics as A New Era. It then made $3.2 million in its third weekend, $1.8 million in its fourth, and $828,265 in its fifth, before dropping out of the box office top ten in its sixth.

Outside of the United States and Canada, the film earned $9.3 million from 33 markets in its opening weekend. This included $3.8 million in the United Kingdom from 746 cinemas (the second-widest release of all-time, after No Time to Die in 2021), and $1.3 million in Australia. The film added $6.6 million in its second weekend, $3.6 million in its third, $3.8 million in its fourth, and $2.2 million in its fifth. It made an additional $715,000 in its seventh weekend.

Critical response
  Audiences polled by CinemaScore gave the film an average grade of "A" on an A+ to F scale (same as the first film), while PostTrak reported 93% of audience members gave it a positive score, with 79% saying they would definitely recommend it.

Accolades

References

External links

Downton Abbey
2020s historical drama films
2022 drama films
2022 films
American historical drama films
American LGBT-related films
American sequel films
British historical drama films
British LGBT-related films
British sequel films
Domestic workers in films
Films about old age
Films about social class
Films based on television series
Films directed by Simon Curtis
Films impacted by the COVID-19 pandemic
Films set in the 1920s
Films set in 1928
Films set in country houses
Films set in England
Films shot in Hampshire
Films with screenplays by Julian Fellowes
Focus Features films
Universal Pictures films
2020s English-language films
2020s American films
2020s British films